Krasny Oktyabr is a rural locality (a settlement) and the administrative center of Krasnooktyabrskoye Rural Settlement, Gus-Khrustalny District, Vladimir Oblast, Russia. The population was 790 as of 2010. There are 13 streets.

Geography 
Krasny Oktyabr is located 48 km southeast of Gus-Khrustalny (the district's administrative centre) by road. Tsikul is the nearest rural locality.

References 

Rural localities in Gus-Khrustalny District